Sergio Donato Contessa (born 14 March 1990) is an Italian footballer who plays as a left back for  club Turris.

Club career
Contessa made his Serie C debut for Fidelis Andria on 4 September 2011 in a game against Spezia.

On 15 January 2019, he signed a two and a half year contract with FeralpiSalò.

On 20 January 2020, he moved to Catanzaro on a one and a half year contract.

On 9 July 2021, he returned to Reggiana on a two year contract.

On 27 August 2022, Contessa signed a two year contract with Turris.

References

External links
 

1990 births
Footballers from Apulia
Sportspeople from the Province of Brindisi
People from Francavilla Fontana
Living people
Association football defenders
Italian footballers
A.S. Melfi players
S.S. Fidelis Andria 1928 players
Reggina 1914 players
S.S. Juve Stabia players
U.S. Lecce players
A.C. Reggiana 1919 players
Calcio Padova players
FeralpiSalò players
U.S. Catanzaro 1929 players
S.S. Turris Calcio players
Serie B players
Serie C players